Grand Mound is a community and census-designated place (CDP) in Thurston County, Washington, United States. It was named and founded by Jotham Weeks Goodell, father of Phoebe Judson, in 1851. The population was 3,301 at the 2020 census. This area uses the 98579 and 98531 zip codes, which also includes Rochester and Gate.

History
Founded in 1851, stage service arrived in 1854. The school was renamed to Maple Lane School in 1959, and closed in 2011.

In the 1920s, strawberries became a major crop in the area, and a processing plant was built, but during the Great Depression the industry failed and the Northern Pacific Railway closed the Grand Mound station. By 1941 the population of the area had grown to about 200 people and the community had a post office along with a store and a single gas station. In 1964, the Grand Mound Fire District was formed, merging twice, in 2002 with Thurston County Fire District #1, and then into the West Thurston Regional Fire Authority. A new fire station was built to serve Grand Mound in 2007.

The community became a census-designated place in 1990.  In March 2008, a 398-room Great Wolf Lodge opened in Grand Mound, which was majority owned by the Confederated Tribes of the Chehalis Reservation.

Geography
Grand Mound is in the southern part of Thurston County, near the county line with Lewis County, immediately north of Centralia. Interstate 5 and U.S. Route 12 serve the community, with the latter leaving Interstate 5 at the Grand Mound exit to head west to Grays Harbor. It is located on Grand Mound Prairie, which was named after a  tree-covered hill in the area, which was the largest of several similar mounds in the area.

Prairie Creek is the only stream within the town's limits. It flows into the nearby Chehalis River, and the confluence of the two is located immediately southwest of the town. Scatter Creek can be found just north of Grand Mound, where it flows west through the Scatter Creek Wildlife Recreation Area and makes its way to its confluence with the Chehalis River, just south of nearby Rochester.

Just north of Grand Mound is the Scatter Creek Unit, a 915-acre (370.29-hectare) wildlife reserve which contains one of the few remaining areas of south Puget Sound prairie.

Demographics

As of the census of 2000, there were 1,948 people, 687 households, and 529 families residing in the CDP. The population density was 621.2 people per square mile (239.5/km2). There were 734 housing units at an average density of 234.1/sq mi (90.3/km2). The racial makeup of the CDP was 87.99% White, 0.31% African American, 1.23% Native American, 0.31% Asian, 0.10% Pacific Islander, 6.62% from other races, and 3.44% from two or more races. Hispanic or Latino of any race were 10.16% of the population.

There were 687 households, out of which 38.0% had children under the age of 18 living with them, 57.2% were married couples living together, 12.7% had a female householder with no husband present, and 22.9% were non-families. 16.7% of all households were made up of individuals, and 5.4% had someone living alone who was 65 years of age or older. The average household size was 2.84 and the average family size was 3.13.

In the CDP, the age distribution of the population shows 29.1% under the age of 18, 9.7% from 18 to 24, 30.9% from 25 to 44, 21.2% from 45 to 64, and 9.1% who were 65 years of age or older. The median age was 33 years. For every 100 females, there were 104.6 males. For every 100 females age 18 and over, there were 102.8 males.

The median income for a household in the CDP was $42,153, and the median income for a family was $41,864. Males had a median income of $40,250 versus $24,511 for females. The per capita income for the CDP was $16,008. About 13.5% of families and 14.8% of the population were below the poverty line, including 18.6% of those under age 18 and 12.5% of those age 65 or over.

Arts and culture

Historic buildings and sites

Several historical markers can be found in Grand Mound. A historical marker in the community commemorates a successful attempt by the townswomen of Grand Mound to vote in Washington territorial elections. Just south of Grand Mound, on Old Highway 99, is an Oregon Trail marker, established in 1916 by the Daughters and Sons of the American Revolution. A monument across from Grand Mound Cemetery marks the former location of Ft. Henness, a stockade built and occupied during the Puget Sound War of 1855-56.

Government

Fire and emergency services are provided by the West Thurston Regional Fire Authority, with a single station located along Sargent Road. Grand Mound lacks a post office. Mail delivery is largely provided by the post office in neighboring Rochester; most locations in Grand Mound have Rochester addresses. A few locations on the south side of Grand Mound have Centralia addresses.

See also
 Mima mounds

References

Census-designated places in Thurston County, Washington
Census-designated places in Washington (state)
Unincorporated communities in Thurston County, Washington
Unincorporated communities in Washington (state)